Seyyed Mosque is the biggest and the most famous mosque from the Qajar era in Isfahan. It was founded by Seyyed Mohammad Bagher Shafti, one of the most famous clergymen in Isfahan. It was founded in the middle of the 19th century, but its tiling lasted until the end of the century. The seyyed mosque is the best sample for studying the tiling art in the Qajar era.

Gallery

See also
 Islam in Iran

References 

Mosque architecture
19th-century mosques
Mosques in Isfahan